Sadat is a suffix, which is given to families believed to be descendants of the Islamic prophet, Muhammad.

It can also be a given name in some countries.

Afghan ethnic name

Sadat is a recognized ethnic name in Afghanistan

Notable people with this name
 Sadat Abul Masud (active 1972), Indian judge
 Sadat Bukari (born 1989), Ghanaian footballer 
 Sadat Hossain (born 1984), Bangladeshi author, film-maker and novelist
 Sadat Karim (born 1991), Ghanaian footballer
 Sadat Mansoor Naderi (born 1977), Afghan businessman
 Sadat Ouro-Akoriko (born 1988), Togolese footballer 
 Anwar Sadat (1918–1981), former President of Egypt
 Jehan Sadat (1933–2021), widow of Anwar Sadat
 Mohamed Anwar Esmat Sadat, Egyptian politician
 Atef Sadat, Egyptian Air Force pilot
 Nazmus Sadat (born 1986), Bangladeshi cricketer
 Talaat Sadat (1954–2011), Egyptian politician
 Zallascht Sadat (born 1986), Afghan and German model
 Abu Sadat Mohammad Sayem (1916–1997), Bangladeshi jurist and statesman
 Sadat Tebazaalwa (born 1985), Ugandan boxer
 Sadat X (born Derek Murphy, 1968), American rapper

See also
 Saadat (disambiguation)

References

Surnames